The Police Coronation Medal was sanctioned in 1911 as an award to policemen, members of ambulance units, firemen and Royal Parks' staff on duty during the official celebrations of the coronation of King George V that took place during 1911.

Award
The medal was presented in silver to all ranks.  It continued the practice of awarding a special medal to police on duty during major royal celebrations that commenced with Queen Victoria's Golden and Diamond Jubilee Police Medals, and Edward VII's Police Coronation Medal, although qualification was now widened to include bodies outside London.

Several service organisations qualified, with the name of the organisation shown on the reverse of the medal.  
A total of 31,822 medals were awarded:
Metropolitan Police 19,783
Scottish Police 2,800
St John Ambulance Brigade 2,755
County and Borough Police 2,565
City of London Police 1,400
London Fire Brigade 1,374
Royal Irish Constabulary 585
St Andrew's Ambulance Corps 310
Police Ambulance Service 130
Royal Parks 120

No recipient was permitted to receive both the Police Coronation Medal and the more broadly awarded Coronation Medal 1911.

Description
It was designed by the Australian sculptor Bertram Mackennal.
 Obverse: A crowned left-facing bust of King George V with the inscription GEORGIVS V REX ET IND: IMP:.
 Reverse:  The Imperial Crown with an ornate surround, with the inscription CORONATION 1911 below and the name of the service the recipient was serving with above.
Red with a narrow central blue stripe, with a similar stripe towards each edge.
 The recipient's rank and name were engraved on the edge of the medal.
 The medal was worn in date order with other Royal commemorative medals. These were worn before campaign medals until November 1918, after which the order of wear was changed, with such medals now worn after campaign medals and before long service awards.

References

External links 
 King George V Coronation (Police) Medal
 ODM of the United Kingdom - ribbon chart

Civil awards and decorations of the United Kingdom
George V
1911 establishments in the United Kingdom
Law enforcement awards and honors
Awards established in 1911
Awards disestablished in 1911